Kreischeria is a genus of extinct trigonotarbid arachnids known from the Carboniferous of Germany.

History 

Kreischeria was first described by Geinitz in 1882, where it was erroneously identified as a Pseudoscorpion. Haase later identified the genus correctly as a trigontarbid, but under the original name Anthracomarti. Fairly recently, the holotype was rediscovered after being lost for many years, and in 1997 the genus was described in detail.

References

Further reading 
 J. A. Dunlop, D. Penney, and D. Jekel. 2013. A summary list of fossil spiders and their relatives. In N. Platnick (ed.), The World Spider Catalog, version 14.0. American Museum of Natural History [M. Clapham/M. Clapham/M. Clapham]

Trigonotarbids